A Pennington clamp, also known as a Duval clamp, is a surgical clamp with a triangular eyelet. Used for grasping tissue, particularly during intestinal and rectal operations. Also used in some OB/GYN procedures, particularly caesarian section. Under the name 'Duval clamp' they are occasionally used much like a Foerster clamp to atraumatically grasp lung tissue. The clamp is named after David Geoffrey Pennington, an Australian surgeon who is a pioneer of microsurgeries.

Non-medical uses

It is commonly used in body piercing to hold the skin in place, and guide the needle through it.

See also
Foerster clamp
Instruments used in general surgery

References

Medical clamps
Body piercing